Panopinae is a subfamily of small-headed flies (Acroceridae). Their larvae are endoparasites of spiders in the infraorder Mygalomorphae.

Genera
The subfamily includes 24 extant genera:
 Apelleia Bellardi, 1862
 Apsona Westwood, 1876
 Archipialea Schlinger, 1973
 Arrhynchus Philippi, 1871
 Astomella Latreille, 1809
 Astomelloides Schlinger, 1959
 Camposella Cole, 1919
 Coquena Schlinger in Schlinger, Gillung & Borkent, 2013
 Corononcodes Speiser, 1920
 Eulonchus Gerstaecker, 1856
 Exetasis Walker, 1852
 Lasia Wiedemann, 1824
 Lasioides Gil Collado, 1928
 Leucopsina Westwood, 1876
 Mesophysa Macquart, 1838
 Ocnaea Erichson, 1840
 Panops Lamarck, 1804 
 Physegastrella Brunetti, 1926
 Pialea Erichson, 1840
 Psilodera Gray in Griffith & Pidgeon, 1832
 Pterodontia Gray in Griffith & Pidgeon, 1832
 Pteropexus Macquart, 1846
 Rhysogaster Aldrich, 1927
 Stenopialea Speiser, 1920

References

External links
Encyclopedia of Life

Acroceridae
Brachycera subfamilies
Taxa named by Ignaz Rudolph Schiner